The Tonglushan mine is a Chinese copper mine located  east of the city of Daye in Hubei province. The mine is operated by China Daye Non-Ferrous Metals Mining Ltd., a subsidiary of China Nonferrous Metal Mining Group. On 12 March 2017, the open-pit mine was the site of a tailings dam failure which killed at least 2 workers. The operating company, China Daye Non-Ferrous Metals Mining reportedly incurred a 45.2M Yuan loss due to the incident after an investigation launched by the government of Huangshi city. Mining and illegal extraction of material under the dam was blamed for its failure.

See also
List of mines in China
Dam failure
Tailings

References

Copper mining
Mines in China
Floods in China